Chiquihuitlán is the most divergent variety of Mazatec, 47% intelligible with Huautla, the prestige variety, and even less intelligible with other Mazatecan languages.

Background 
Chiquihuitlán Mazatec is an endangered language with only around 1,500 native speakers today. This language is native to the Northern part of Oaxaca, Mexico. It is also part of the Oto-Manguean languages, a family of languages native to the Americas.

Language revitalization
There has been an undergoing effort to gather as much information about the language as possible. Usually the group of people that speak this language is relatively small, and are forced to leave their native language and adopt the language with the greatest possibility of communication. An effort to help people keep their native language while learning Spanish are those undergone by teacher Gloria Ruiz de Bravo Abuja that created the institution Instituto de Investigación e Integración Social del Estado de Oaxaca en 1969.  Another program is Archivo de lenguas indígenas del estate de Oaxaca which publishes promising findings in a series of linguistic schemes.

References

External links
The Archive of the Indigenous Languages of Latin America has audio samples of the language. 
Maria Sabina - Mujer Espiritu video 

Mazatecan languages